Albert Felix Pierotti (October 24, 1895 – February 12, 1964) was a professional American football center and Major League Baseball pitcher.

Football career
Pierotti played in the American Professional Football League with the Akron Pros, Cleveland Tigers and the New York Brickley Giants. Brickley's New York Giants are not related to the modern-day New York Giants. Al won the 1920 NFL Championship with Akron.

When the AFPA became the National Football League in 1922, Pierotti went on to play with the Milwaukee Badgers and Racine Legion. In 1926, Pierotti played for the Boston Bulldogs of the American Football League, an NFL rival started by Red Grange and his agent C. C. Pyle. After the Bulldogs folded, Pierotti played semipro football for the University of Peabody. He returned to the NFL with the Providence Steam Roller and later played with the NFL's Boston Bulldogs.

Prior to playing professional football, Al played college football at Washington and Lee University.  He coached football for one year (1918) at Tufts where his team had a record of 2 wins and 3 losses.

Baseball career

Pierotti began his professional baseball career with the minor league Providence Grays of the Eastern League. The following season, he joined the Boston Braves in August, appearing in six games. He pitched in two games the following year before returning to the Eastern League with the Pittsfield Hillies. After one more season, split between Pittsfield and the Waterbury Brasscos, Pierotti returned to football full-time.

Wrestling career
In 1931, Pierotti began wrestling. On July 30, 1931 he challenged Jim Londos for the World Heavyweight Championship at the Coney Island Velodrome. Londos defeated Pierotti in 17:05 with an airplane spin. In 1932, Pierotti began refereeing matches at the Boston Arena while continuing to wrestle occasionally.

Later life and death
In 1935, Pierotti became an assistant football coach at Chelsea High School. In 1936 he became head coach of the school's baseball team. From 1936 to 1938 he also hosted a sports talk show on WMEX. Pierotti remained at Chelsea High School as a teacher and baseball coach until his death on February 12, 1964.

References

External links

 

1895 births
1964 deaths
Akron Pros players
American football offensive linemen
American male professional wrestlers
American sports radio personalities
Boston Braves players
Boston Bulldogs (AFL) players
Boston Bulldogs (NFL) players
Cleveland Tigers (NFL) players
Cleveland Tigers-Indians coaches
High school baseball coaches in the United States
High school football coaches in Massachusetts
High school football coaches in Ohio
Milwaukee Badgers players
New York Brickley Giants players
Pittsfield Hillies players
Professional wrestling referees
Providence Grays (minor league) players
Providence Steam Roller players
Racine Legion players
Tufts Jumbos football coaches
Washington and Lee Generals baseball players
Washington and Lee Generals football players
Waterbury Brasscos players
Players of American football from Boston
Baseball players from Boston